Kincardine railway station served the town of Kincardine, Fife, Scotland from 1893 to 1930 on the Kincardine Line.

History 
The station opened on 18 December 1893 by the North British Railway. The goods yard was to the north. A second platform was added in 1906 when the line to the east was extended. The original signal box was also replaced at this time. The station closed to passengers on 7 July 1930.

Reopening 
Plans have been submitted for a new station at Kincardine. The site is currently being surveyed and electrification of the line has also been planned.

References

External links 

Disused railway stations in Fife
Railway stations in Great Britain opened in 1893
Railway stations in Great Britain closed in 1930
Former North British Railway stations
1893 establishments in Scotland
1930 disestablishments in Scotland